The 2017 Swope Park Rangers season was the club's 2nd year of play, along with their second season in the Western Conference of the United Soccer League, the second tier of the United States Soccer Pyramid. For the 2nd straight year the Swope Park Rangers finished fourth in the Western Conference and were Runners Up in the USL Championship. This time losing 1-0 to Louisville City FC.

USL Regular season

Standings

Matches

USL Playoffs

References

Swope
Swope
Sporting Kansas City II seasons